Kamay ni Cain is a 1957 action film directed by Gerardo de León, written by Cesar Amigo and Clodualdo del Mundo Sr., starring Zaldy Zshornack and Fernando Poe, Jr.

Cast 
 Zaldy Zshornack as Eduardo
 Fernando Poe, Jr. as Ernesto
 Edna Luna
 Leonor Vergara

Awards and nominations

References

External links 
 

1957 films
1950s action films
Philippine black-and-white films
Films directed by Gerardo de León
Philippine action films